El Sekka El Hadid Sporting Club, is an Egyptian football club based in Cairo, Egypt. The club is currently playing in the Egyptian Second Division, the second-highest league in the Egyptian football league system.

Founded in 1903, the club is the oldest football club in Egypt, and the Middle East. Among the former club players is Hussein Hegazi, Dulwich Hamlet's former player.

History
In 1903, El Sekka El Hadid Club formed the first football team in Egypt. The team was mainly formed of British and Italian engineers working in the maintenance workshops affiliated to the Railway Authority of the time. When it was necessary to have a national football competition in Egypt, El Sekka El Hadid became one of the Egyptian Premier League founders. The team earned the 8th place (out of 11) in the league's first season; 1948–49 Season.

As of 2010, El Sekka El Hadid participated in 23 seasons of the Egyptian Premier League; 1992-93 season being the team's last. The team is currently competing in the Egyptian Second Division.  However, the fans of this historic team were shocked to see their team fall to the Egyptian Third Division. By the end of 2009–10 Egyptian Second Division, Al-Sekka Al-Hadid occupied the last place in Group B and relegation to third division became a reality.

Honours

Cairo League
 Winners (2): 1923–24, 1925–26
Sultan Hussein Cup
 Winners (2): 1923–24, 1935–36
Egypt Cup
Runner Up (7):1922-23, 1923–24, 1935–36, 1936–37, 1945–46, 1950–51, 1963–64

Players

John Sekka

References

Egyptian Second Division
Football clubs in Cairo
Football clubs in Egypt
Association football clubs established in 1903
1903 establishments in Egypt